The Vent! is a Canadian English language sketch comedy television series, produced by A Sweet Little Production Company. The series premiered on June 28, 2009 at 8:30 pm EST on Canadian digital cable specialty channel, OUTtv.

Premise
The Vent! is a sketch comedy series developed for television, the Internet and mobile phones. The series revolves around one specific topic where 8 segments are created around that topic. The series was created, developed and starts Maggie Cassella and Charlie Smith

External links
 The Vent!

2000s Canadian satirical television series
2009 Canadian television series debuts
2009 Canadian television series endings
2000s Canadian sketch comedy television series
2000s Canadian LGBT-related comedy television series
OutTV (Canadian TV channel) original programming